Avoca Township was located in Pottawatomie County, Oklahoma.  It should not be confused with Avoca, which was a smaller community inside the township.

Location
Avoca township was located in southeastern Pottawatomie County, with Konawa Municipal Township (and the Seminole County line) to the east, St. Louis Township to the north and the South Canadian River to the south. The western boundary was about two and a half miles west of present-day Asher. Post offices in the Avoca Township area included:

Statistics
The following table shows the population grown and then decline of Avoca Township.  The population decline beginning in 1920 can be attributed to a growing interest in Shawnee, OK, in the northern part of the county.

Schools in the township
Schools in the township (and what is known about them) include:
Asher (c. 1913–present).  Asher is and was the only high school developed within the township.  See Asher, Oklahoma.
Avoca (1892 - ?).  Avoca had a small school near what is now the cemetery.  See Avoca, Oklahoma
Cook (1892 - aft. 1920).  The school, originally one-room, was formed in 1892 and later expanded when a second and larger room was added.  At some point between 1910–1920, the building was completely refurbished and again enlarged.  It is believed this school was located near the Pottawatomie-Seminole county line.
Gravel Hill School (1903 - ?).  This school replaced Lazell School.
Lazzell (1895–1903).  This school, housed in a log cabin, was located two and a half miles east of Asher, near Chisholm Springs.  It began around December 1895 and closed in April 1903 (due to financial shortfalls, there was no school 1899-1900).  It was replaced by Gravel Hill School.

Sacred Heart.  The school had a small enrollment.

References

Geography of Pottawatomie County, Oklahoma